Tabanus americanus, the American horse fly, is a species of horse-fly in the family Tabanidae.

Distribution
Canada, United States.

References

Tabanidae
Insects described in 1771
Taxa named by Johann Reinhold Forster
Diptera of North America